Trhala fialky dynamitem  is a 1992 Czech comedy film a Czech family, that decides after the Velvet revolution to start a business in new market conditions.

External links
 

1992 films
Czechoslovak comedy films
1992 comedy films
Czech comedy films